The 1968 NBA draft was the 22nd annual draft of the National Basketball Association (NBA). The draft was held on April 3, 1968, and May 8 and 10, 1968 before the 1968–69 season. In this draft, 14 NBA teams took turns selecting amateur U.S. college basketball players. A player who had finished his four-year college eligibility was eligible for selection. If a player left college early, he would not be eligible for selection until his college class graduated. The first two picks in the draft belonged to the teams that finished last in each division, with the order determined by a coin flip. The San Diego Rockets won the coin flip and were awarded the first overall pick, while the Baltimore Bullets were awarded the second pick. The remaining first-round picks and the subsequent rounds were assigned to teams in reverse order of their win–loss record in the previous season. Six teams that had the best records in previous season were not awarded second round draft picks. Two expansion franchises, the Milwaukee Bucks and the Phoenix Suns, took part in the NBA Draft for the first time and were assigned the seventh and eighth pick in the first round, along with the last two picks of each subsequent round. The St. Louis Hawks relocated to Atlanta and became the Atlanta Hawks prior to the start of the season. The draft consisted of 21 rounds comprising 214 players selected.

Draft selections and draftee career notes
Elvin Hayes from the University of Houston was selected first overall by the San Diego Rockets. Wes Unseld from the University of Louisville was selected second by the Baltimore Bullets. He went on to win the Rookie of the Year Award and the Most Valuable Player Award in his first season, becoming only the second player to win both awards in the same season, after Wilt Chamberlain in 1960. Hayes and Unseld have been inducted to the Basketball Hall of Fame. They were also named in the 50 Greatest Players in NBA History list announced at the league's 50th anniversary in 1996. Hayes and Unseld both won the NBA championship with the Washington Bullets in 1978. In the Finals, Unseld was named as the Finals Most Valuable Player. Unseld, who spent all of his 13-year playing career with the Bullets, was also selected to one All-NBA Team and five All-Star Games, while Hayes was selected to six All-NBA Teams and twelve All-Star Games. Bob Kauffman, the third pick, is the only other player from this draft who has been selected to an All-Star Game; he was selected to three All-Star Games during his career.

Unseld became a head coach after ending his playing career. He coached the Washington Bullets for seven seasons. Three other players drafted also went on to have a coaching career: 12th pick Don Chaney and 79th pick Rick Adelman. Chaney coached four NBA teams and won the Coach of the Year Award in 1991 with the Houston Rockets. Adelman coached four NBA teams, most recently with the Houston Rockets. He lost the NBA Finals twice with the Portland Trail Blazers in 1990 and 1992.

In the fourteenth round, the Seattle SuperSonics selected Mike Warren of UCLA. However, Warren never played professional basketball; he opted for an acting career in films and television instead.

Key

Draft

Other picks
The following list includes other draft picks who have appeared in at least one NBA game.

Trades
  On October 20, 1967, the Chicago Bulls acquired Flynn Robinson, 1968 and 1969 second-round picks from the Cincinnati Royals in exchange for Guy Rodgers. The Bulls used the pick to draft Ron Dunlap.
  On November 27, 1967, the Cincinnati Royals acquired a third-round pick from the Detroit Pistons in exchange for Len Chappell. The Royals used the pick to draft Fred Foster.
  On January 9, 1968, the Chicago Bulls acquired Jim Barnes and a third-round pick from the Los Angeles Lakers in exchange for Erwin Mueller. The Bulls used the pick to draft Dave Newmark.

Notes

See also
 List of first overall NBA draft picks

References
General

 
 
 
 

Specific

External links
 NBA.com
 NBA.com: NBA Draft History

Draft
National Basketball Association draft
NBA draft
NBA draft
NBA draft
Basketball in New York City
Sporting events in New York City